Zosteractinidae is a family of millipedes belonging to the order Julida.

Genera:
 Zosteractis Loomis, 1943

References

Julida